Nizhnyaya Lipovka is a rural locality (a selo) in Ternovskoye Rural Settlement, Kamyshinsky District, Volgograd Oblast, Russia. The population was 14 as of 2010.

Geography 
Nizhnyaya Lipovka is located in forest steppe, on the Volga Upland, on the west bank of the Volgograd Reservoir, 15 km northeast of Kamyshin (the district's administrative centre) by road. Ternovka is the nearest rural locality.

References 

Rural localities in Kamyshinsky District